Akbarabad-e Hejri (also Romanized as Akbarābād-e Hejrī; also known as Akbarābād and Akbarābād-e Hūjī) is a village in Azadegan Rural District, in the Central District of Rafsanjan County, Kerman Province, Iran. At the 2006 census, its population was 405, in 103 families.

References 

Populated places in Rafsanjan County